Palaina intercollis, also known as the Intermediate Hill staircase snail, is a species of staircase snail that is endemic to Australia's Lord Howe Island in the Tasman Sea.

Description
The globose pupiform shell of adult snails is 4.7–5 mm in height, with a diameter of 2.6–2.8 mm. It is light to dark golden-brown in colour, sometimes with a white peripheral band, and with paler ribs. The circular aperture has a strongly reflected lip. The animal has a white body with dark grey cephalic tentacles and black eyes.

Habitat
The snail is most common in the Intermediate Hill area and on the lower slopes of Mount Lidgbird.

References

 
intercollis
Gastropods of Lord Howe Island
Gastropods described in 2010